The  is a high-speed Shinkansen train service operated on the Tōhoku Shinkansen between  and  by East Japan Railway Company (JR East) in Japan.

Name
The word yamabiko is usually translated as 'echo', particularly one which is heard in the mountains.

Rolling stock
 E2 series (since March 1997)
 E3 series
 E5 series (since November 2011)
 E6 series (since 16 March 2013)
 H5 series (since 26 March 2016)

Former rolling stock
 200 series (June 1982 – November 2011)
 E1 series (Max Yamabiko) (July 1994 – December 1999)
 E4 series (Max Yamabiko) (until 28 September 2012)

History

1959–1963: Semi express
On 1 February 1959, the name Yamabiko was introduced on a  service between Fukushima and Morioka on the Tōhoku Main Line. This service operated until 30 September 1963.

1965–1982: Limited express
From 1 October 1965, the name was reintroduced for limited express services operating between Ueno in Tokyo and Morioka. These services continued until 22 June 1982, the day before the Tōhoku Shinkansen opened.

1982–Present: Shinkansen
From the start of services on the newly opened Tōhoku Shinkansen on 23 June 1982, Yamabiko became the name used for the limited-stop shinkansen services operating initially between Ōmiya and Morioka, later between Ueno and Morioka, and eventually between Tokyo and Morioka.

Since 1 July 1992, some Yamabiko services have run coupled with Tsubasa services (as of 2011 formed of E3 series sets) between Tokyo and Fukushima.

From 19 November 2011, E5 series trainsets were introduced on some Yamabiko services, replacing the remaining 200 series-operated services.

Special event train services

Sayonara 200 series Yamabiko
On 30 March 2013, a special  train operated from Morioka to Tokyo, as a farewell run for the 200 series on Yamabiko services.

See also
 List of named passenger trains of Japan

References

External links

 E2 series Hayate/Yamabiko/Nasuno 
 E3 series Tsubasa/Yamabiko/Nasuno 
 E5 series Hayabusa/Hayate/Yamabiko/Nasuno 
 E6 series Komachi/Hayabusa/Yamabiko/Nasuno 

Tōhoku Shinkansen
Railway services introduced in 1959
Named Shinkansen trains